Steven Edward Delabar (born July 17, 1983) is an American former professional baseball pitcher. A native of Kentucky, Delabar attended Central Hardin High School and Volunteer State Community College. He was selected late in the 2003 MLB draft by the San Diego Padres and began his minor league career in 2004. He played in the low minor leagues for several seasons until he sustained a severe elbow injury in 2009.

In 2010, Delabar worked as a substitute teacher and then became an assistant high school baseball coach. Delabar helped to implement an arm conditioning program for pitchers at the high school and found that his own pitching velocity improved significantly. After a tryout with the Seattle Mariners in early 2011, Delabar was assigned to the team's Class-A affiliate. He progressed to Advanced-A, Double-A, and Triple-A, then to the major leagues. His MLB debut came late in 2011 at the age of 28. He was traded to the Toronto Blue Jays in 2012, and played with them through the 2015 season.

Early career
Steve Delabar went to Central Hardin High School in Cecilia, Kentucky. where he was drafted by the Anaheim Angels in the 43rd round of the 2002 MLB draft, but elected to go to college. He attended Volunteer State Community College. After one year there, he was drafted in the 29th round, 851st overall, in the 2003 Major League Baseball draft by the San Diego Padres.

Professional career

Minor league career
Delabar did not play professionally in 2003. He started the 2004 season with the Arizona League Padres, going 3–4 with a 4.37 ERA before earning a promotion to the Single-A Short-Season Eugene Emeralds. He played all of 2005 with Eugene, going 4–6 in 16 starts with a 4.76 ERA. He played 2006 with the Single-A Fort Wayne TinCaps, then the Wizards, earning an 8–9 record with a 3.41 ERA in 27 starts with 118 strikeouts. He started 2007 with Single-A Advanced Lake Elsinore Storm, but was demoted back to Fort Wayne after registering a 5.59 ERA out of the bullpen. He started 2008 with Fort Wayne, but was cut after a 5.27 ERA as a relief pitcher.

On June 7, he signed a deal with the independent Florence Freedom of the Frontier League, where he played four games before signing with the independent Brockton Rox of the Canadian-American Association, going 3–3 in 11 starts with a 3.01 ERA. He played all of 2009 with Brockton, where he had a 3.36 ERA in 12 appearances. His 2009 season ended when he suffered a fractured right elbow. The injury was so serious that a steel plate and nine screws were embedded to stabilize the elbow during the surgery.

He did not play professionally in 2010, working as a substitute teacher in his hometown of Elizabethtown, Kentucky at John Hardin High School. He also played slow pitch softball, where he won the 2010 Louisville Invitational Tournament Miken Homerun Derby. He began working as an assistant baseball coach at the high school. While introducing an arm conditioning program to his high school players, Delabar's own fastball returned to the 92-97 mph range.  Delabar signed a minor league deal with the Mariners for 2011. He was assigned to Single-A Advanced High Desert Mavericks before being promoted to the Double-A Jackson Generals and the Triple-A Tacoma Rainiers.

Major league career

Seattle Mariners (2011–2012)
Delabar was called up by the Seattle Mariners from the minor leagues on September 6, . He made his MLB debut on September 11 against the Kansas City Royals. Delabar recorded his first major league win on September 14, 2011, against the New York Yankees.

Toronto Blue Jays (2012–2015)
Delabar was traded to the Toronto Blue Jays on July 30, 2012, for outfielder Eric Thames. On August 13, he struck out 4 men in the 10th inning, and recorded the win in a 3–2 victory over the Chicago White Sox. In doing so, Delabar became the first pitcher in major league history to record four strikeouts in an extra inning.

Delabar was named a Final Vote candidate for the 2013 Major League Baseball All-Star Game. He posted a 5–1 record with a 1.58 ERA and an American League reliever-leading 57 strikeouts in 40 innings over 35 games played prior to the All-Star Game roster announcement. Delabar earned his first career save on July 10, 2013, in a game against the Cleveland Indians. On July 11, it was announced that he had been elected to the All-Star game in the Final Vote contest, receiving 9.6 million votes. Delabar pitched  of an inning and struck out Buster Posey on five pitches in the 2013 MLB All-Star Game.

On July 30, 2013, while facing the Oakland Athletics, Delabar struck out all three batters in the eighth inning on nine total pitches to become the 48th major-league pitcher to accomplish an immaculate inning. Delabar also became only the fourth pitcher in major-league history to both strike out four batters in one inning and throw an immaculate inning, joining Bob Gibson, A. J. Burnett, and Félix Hernández. On August 4, Delabar was placed on the 15-day disabled list with right shoulder inflammation. In total for 2013, he posted a 5–5 record, 3.22 ERA, and 82 strikeouts in 58 innings.

After opening the 2014 season with a 4.68 ERA and 16 walks through 25 innings of work, Delabar was optioned to the Triple-A Buffalo Bisons on June 17, 2014, to make room for Munenori Kawasaki. He was called back on June 19 after Brett Cecil was placed on the disabled list, without appearing for the Bisons.  He was then optioned back to the Bisons on June 20. When the major league rosters expanded on September 1, Delabar was not among the names announced to be called up. On September 2 the organization announced that he had been sent home for the remainder of the season to rest in preparation for the 2015 season. In 2014, Delabar posted a 3–0 record, 4.91 ERA, 21 strikeouts, and a 1.48 WHIP in 30 appearances (25 innings).

Despite a strong showing during 2015 spring training, Delabar was optioned to minor league camp on March 26. He was recalled from Buffalo on May 3. He was optioned back to Buffalo on July 25 when Aaron Sanchez was activated from the disabled list. Delabar was recalled in September, but was not added to the Blue Jays postseason roster. He finished the 2015 campaign with a 2–0 record, 5.22 ERA, and 30 strikeouts in 29 innings.

On January 15, 2016, Delabar and the Blue Jays avoided salary arbitration by agreeing to a one-year, $835,000 contract. On March 29, the Blue Jays released Delabar.

Cincinnati Reds (2016)
On April 2, 2016, Delabar signed a minor league deal with the Cincinnati Reds. On May 7, his contract was purchased by the Reds. On May 17, in a game against the Cleveland Indians, Delabar walked four consecutive batters with the bases loaded thus allowing four runs to score.  Delabar was designated for assignment by the Reds on May 21, and sent outright to the Triple-A Louisville Bats on May 24. On June 24, Delabar was released by the Reds.

Hiroshima Toyo Carp (2016)
On June 25, 2016, Delabar signed with the Hiroshima Toyo Carp of Nippon Professional Baseball.

Cleveland Indians
Delabar signed a minor league contract with the Cleveland Indians on January 13, 2017. The deal included an invitation to the Indians' 2017 spring training camp. On April 24, Delabar was suspended for 80 games after testing positive for ostarine. Delabar was released by the Indians on July 5, 2017.

Texas Rangers
On January 4, 2018, Delabar signed a minor league contract with the Texas Rangers with an invitation to spring training. He was released on April 20.

Retirement
On February 4, 2019, Delabar announced that he will no longer pursue playing opportunities on the Outta Park show with Barry Davis.

Pitching style
Delabar throws three pitches: a hard four-seam fastball at an average of 95 mph, a slider from 85 to 88 mph that he throws occasionally to right-handed hitters, and a split-finger fastball that registers speeds in the mid-to-upper 80s. All three pitches are excellent strikeout pitches, with well above-average whiff rates of 25% on the fastball, 33% on the slider, and 48% on the splitter. The high whiff rates contribute to a K/9 rate of over 11 for Delabar's career.

See also

 List of Major League Baseball single-inning strikeout leaders
 List of Toronto Blue Jays team records

References

External links

1983 births
Living people
American sportspeople in doping cases
American expatriate baseball players in Canada
American expatriate baseball players in Japan
American League All-Stars
Arizona League Padres players
Baseball players from Kentucky
Brockton Rox players
Buffalo Bisons (minor league) players
Cincinnati Reds players
Eugene Emeralds players
Florence Freedom players
Fort Wayne Wizards players
Gulf Coast Blue Jays players
High Desert Mavericks players
Hiroshima Toyo Carp players
Jackson Generals (Southern League) players
Lake Elsinore Storm players
Louisville Bats players
Major League Baseball pitchers
Nippon Professional Baseball pitchers
Seattle Mariners players
Tacoma Rainiers players
Toronto Blue Jays players
Volunteer State Pioneers baseball players